Barbara J. Heath (born 1960) is a professor in the Department of Anthropology at The University of Tennessee, Knoxville who specializes in historical archaeology of eastern North America and the Caribbean. Her research and teaching focus on the archaeology of the African diaspora, colonialism, historic landscapes, material culture, public archaeology and interpretation, and Thomas Jefferson.

Background
Heath was born in Norwood, Massachusetts in 1960. She received her Bachelor of Arts in Anthropology and Spanish from the College of William and Mary in 1982, and her MA (1983) and Ph.D. (1988) in American Civilization from the University of Pennsylvania. Her dissertation research focused on low-fired, hand-built coarse earthenwares made historically by people of African descent in the Caribbean, and is entitled Afro-Caribbean Ware: A Study of Ethnicity on St. Eustatius. Heath has conducted fieldwork in Virginia, Tennessee, and in the Lesser Antilles.

Employment history
Heath is currently a Professor in, and Department Head of, the Department of Anthropology at the University of Tennessee, where she has worked since 2006. Previously, she directed the archaeology program at Thomas Jefferson's Poplar Forest (1992-2006), and worked as an archaeologist Monticello (1988-1991), the James River Institute for Archaeology(1987-1988), the Colonial Williamsburg Foundation (1985-1986), and the College of William and Mary (1983-1986).

Key excavations
Heath has led or participated in a numerous research projects, including current work at Indian Camp and at Coan Hall in Virginia, at Poplar Forest, Monticello, Colonial Williamsburg, and Jordan's Point. In the Caribbean she has worked at Little Bay on Montserrat; as a member of the St. Kitts-Nevis Digital Archaeology Initiative; and on a variety of colonial sites on St. Eustatius, Netherlands Antilles.

Research emphases
Heath is an anthropological archaeologist specializing in historical archaeology. Her research examines institutionalized slavery and racism in the Middle Atlantic, American South and Caribbean, and colonial frontier interactions in the Middle Atlantic, during the recent past (1600-1900).  She examines how people, free and enslaved, created and used material culture—buildings, designed and vernacular landscapes, and handcrafted and mass-produced consumer goods—to promote and strengthen systems of inequality or to survive, challenge and reshape them.  Her interests extend to the dynamics of exchange, whether through formalized relationships recorded in store accounts, or barter and trade.  Currently, she is researching three areas: the production, exchange and use of pottery made by enslaved and free women of African descent in the eighteenth, nineteenth and twentieth centuries in the Leeward Islands; the enslaved communities of Thomas Jefferson in piedmont Virginia; and the origins of slavery in the seventeenth-century Potomac River valley.

Selected books and monographs
Heath, Barbara J. and Jack Gary, editors.  2012. Jefferson's Poplar Forest: Unearthing a Virginia Plantation. University Press of Florida, Gainesville.
Heath, Barbara J., editor. 2001. Jamestown Archaeological Assessment, National Park Service, US Department of the Interior, Washington, D.C.
Heath, Barbara J., 1999. Hidden Lives: The Archaeology of Slave Life at Thomas Jefferson's Poplar Forest. The University Press of Virginia, Charlottesville.

Selected articles

Heath, Barbara J. 2013. Landscape Archaeology at Thomas Jefferson's Poplar Forest. In Sourcebook for Garden Archaeology, edited by Aichal Malek, pp. 697–706. Peter Lang AG /Fondation des Parcs et Jardins de France, Bern.
Heath, Barbara J.  2012. A Brief History of Plantation Archaeology in Virginia. In Jefferson's Poplar Forest: Unearthing a Virginia Plantation, edited by Barbara J. Heath and Jack Gary, pp. 20–45. University Press of Florida, Gainesville.
Heath, Barbara J.  2012. Slave Housing, Household Formation and Community Dynamics at Poplar Forest, 1760s-1810s. In Jefferson's Poplar Forest: Unearthing a Virginia Plantation, edited by Barbara J. Heath and Jack Gary, pp. 105–128. University Press of Florida, Gainesville. 
Heath, Barbara J. and Eleanor Breen. 2012. Assessing Variability among Quartering Sites in Virginia. Northeast Historical Archaeology 38:1-28 (2009).
Heath, Barbara J. and Jack Gary.2012. “Two Tracts of Land at the Poplar Forest”: An Historical and Archaeological Overview of Thomas Jefferson's Central Virginia Plantation and Villa Retreat. In Jefferson's Poplar Forest: Unearthing a Virginia Plantation, edited by Barbara J. Heath and Jack Gary, pp. 1–19. University Press of Florida, Gainesville. 
Klippel, Walter E., Jennifer A. Systelien, and Barbara J. Heath. 2011. Taphonomy and Fish Bones From an Enslaved African American Context at Poplar Forest, Virginia, USA. Archaeofauna 20:27-45.
Heath, Barbara J. 2010. Space and Place within Plantation Quarters in Virginia, 1700-1825. In Cabin, Quarter, Plantation: Architecture and Landscapes of North American Slavery, edited by Clifton Ellis and Rebecca Ginsburg, pp. 156–176. Yale University Press.
Heath, Barbara J. and Lori A. Lee. 2010. Memory, Race and Place: African American Landscapes at Poplar Forest. History Compass 8(12):1352-1368.
Paterson, Alistair G. and Heath, Barbara J. 2009. Current Research in Australia and New Zealand, An Overview. Historical Archaeology 43(3):112-118.
Heath, Barbara J. and Amber Bennett. 2009.  ‘The little spots allow’d them’: The Archaeological Study of African-American Yards. In Perspectives from Historical Archaeology: African Diaspora Archaeology edited by Nicholas Honercamp, pp. 56–72. The Society for Historical Archaeology.
Heath, Barbara J. 2008. Introduction. Quarterly Bulletin of the Archeological Society of Virginia 63(3):109-114.
Heath, Barbara J. 2008. Rediscovering Thomas Jefferson's Poplar Forest. Quarterly Bulletin of the Archeological Society of Virginia 63(3):124-136.
Heath, Barbara J. 2007. Thomas Jefferson's Landscape of Retirement. In Post-Medieval Estate Landscapes: Design, Improvement and Power, edited by Jonathan Finch and Kate Giles, pp. 129–147. The Society for Post-Medieval Archaeology Monograph no. 4. Boydell & Brewer, Ltd., Woodbridge.
Heath, Barbara J. 2004. Engendering Choice: Slavery and Consumerism in Central Virginia. In Engendering African American Archaeology, edited by Amy Young and Jillian Galle, pp. 19–38. University of Tennessee Press, Knoxville.
Heath, Barbara J. and Amber Bennett. 2000. ‘The little spots allow’d them’: The Archaeological Study of African-American Yards.  Historical Archaeology 34(2):38-55 (same as 2009 Heath and Bennett article cited above, 2009).
Heath, Barbara J. 1999. Buttons, Beads and Buckles: Self-Definition within the Bounds of Slavery. In Historical Archaeology, Identity Formation and the Interpretation of Ethnicity, edited by Maria Franklin and Garrett R. Fesler, pp. 47–69.  Colonial Williamsburg Research Publications, Dietz Press, Richmond. 
Heath, Barbara J. 1999. Nineteenth-century Small Farms and Plantations. In The Archaeology of 19th-Century Virginia, edited by John H. Sprinkle and Theodore R. Reinhart, pp. 53–76. Special Publication No.36 of the Archeological Society of Virginia. Dietz Press, Richmond.
Heath, Barbara J. 1999. Yabbas, Monkeys, Jugs and Jars: Local Pottery Production and Its Meaning. In African Sites:  Archaeology in the Caribbean, edited by Jay B. Haviser, pp. 196–220.  Markus Wiener Publishers, Princeton, New Jersey. 
Heath, Barbara J. 1999. “Your Humble Servant”:  Free Artisans in the Monticello Community. In I, too, am America:  Archaeological Studies of African-American Life, edited by Theresa A. Singleton, pp. 193–217. University Press of Virginia, Charlottesville. 
Heath, Barbara J. 1997. Archaeology and Interpretation at Thomas Jefferson's Monticello and Poplar Forest. In Presenting Archaeology to the Public: Digging for Truths, edited by John H. Jameson, pp. 177–192. AltaMira Press, Walnut Creek.
Heath, Barbara J. 1997. Slavery and Consumerism: A Case Study from Central Virginia. African-American Archaeology, Newsletter of the African-American Archaeology Network 19:1-8.
Heath, Barbara J. 1996. Temper, temper: Recent Scholarship on Colonoware in Eighteenth-Century Virginia. In The Archaeology of Eighteenth-Century Virginia, edited by Theodore R. Reinhart, pp. 149–175.  Special Publication No. 35 of the Archeological Society of Virginia, Dietz Press, Richmond.
Heath, Barbara J. 1994. “Discovering the Plantation World of Jefferson's Poplar Forest.” Notes on the State of Poplar Forest, Vol. 2:13-18.
Heath, Barbara J. 1991. Artisan Housing at Monticello: The Stewart/Watkins Site. Quarterly Bulletin of the Archeological Society of Virginia. 46(1):10-16.
Heath, Barbara J. 1991. “Pots of Earth”: Afro-Caribbean Wares from St. Eustatius. Florida Journal of Anthropology 16(7):33-50.

References

External links
Barbara Heath
African-American Archaeology Newsletter, Early Winter 1997
YouTube

American archaeologists
Living people
1960 births
American women archaeologists
People from Norwood, Massachusetts
21st-century American women